The Real World: New Orleans is the twenty-fourth season of MTV's reality television series The Real World, which focuses on a group of diverse strangers living together for several months in a different city each season, as cameras follow their lives and interpersonal relationships. It is the third season of The Real World to be filmed in West South Central States region of the United States, specifically in Louisiana.

The season featured eight people who lived in a house in Uptown New Orleans. It is the fourth season to take place in a city that had hosted a previous season, as the show's ninth season was set in New Orleans in 2000. New Orleans was first reported as the location for the 24th season in a December 2009 article on the website Vevmo.com.

Pre-production began on December 2, 2009, and Production lasted from January to April 24, 2010. It premiered on Wednesday, June 30 of that year, and averaged nearly 2 million viewers for the season, a 25% increase from the previous season, and ranked as the #1 cable program for Wednesday night's 10pm–11pm time slot among viewers aged 12–34. The season premiere was watched by 1.26 million viewers. It consisted of 12 episodes.

Assignment
Most seasons of The Real World, beginning with the fifth season, have included the assignment of a season-long group job or task to the housemates. Continued participation in the assignment has been mandatory to remain part of the cast since the Back to New York season. This season, like the preceding season in Washington, DC, did not require roommates to take part in a group job. However, this season's cast was offered opportunities to volunteer together at various locations. Pre-production announcements by Bunim-Murray Productions indicated that the cast would participate in Hurricane Katrina recovery activities, with co-creator and executive producer Jon Murray stating in a news release, "Hurricane Katrina threw New Orleans for a punch, but the city is coming back and we're hoping our cast members and the series can play a small role in the city's rebirth." Nola.com viewed this announcement as an attempt by Bunim-Murray to reverse the series' reputation as a den of immature and irresponsible behavior on the part of its young cast members. The cast provides assistance to the homeless by working at the New Orleans Mission, and building homes with Habitat for Humanity.

The residence

The cast lived at a house at 1633-1635 Dufossat Street, in Uptown New Orleans. According to Sotheby's website, the  house, which is currently on the market for $1.7 million, features 7 bedrooms, 8 bathrooms, a landscaped front garden, a pool, historic mantels, and an additional apartment equipped with a full kitchen that can be used for an entertainment room or separate quarters for guests or live-in staff. Because the cast was housed in a residential unit instead of a commercial building this season, it was not furnished by IKEA, as residences in recent past seasons.

Police incident
On March 1, 2010, New Orleans' 2nd District police were summoned to the house by cast member Ryan Leslie, who complained that his housemate, Preston Roberson-Charles, with whom he had an argument three weeks earlier, urinated on his toothbrush, and used it to scrub in the inside of a toilet bowl, causing a subsequent sore throat and fever that required Leslie to go to the hospital on February 21, where he was treated for a viral infection. According to Leslie, Roberson-Charles previously called Leslie a "faggot", and threatened to take some action against Leslie's belongings. Leslie learned that Roberson-Charles had soiled his toothbrush only after Leslie had been using it for two weeks.

Police confiscated Leslie's toothbrush as evidence, but did not take a statement by Roberson-Charles. The police report did not indicate whether the police viewed video footage shot in the house while investigating the complaint. Executive producer Jim Johnston declined to comment. Officer Garry Flot, a New Orleans Police Department spokesman, opined that Leslie may have merely wanted the incident documented, as the police would have likely issued a municipal summons to both roommates in order for a judge to determine if a crime had been committed, had Leslie wanted to press charges. Flot further suggested that the incident may have been contrived to generate publicity for the series. Roberson-Charles' soiling of Leslie's toothbrush, as well as Leslie's soiling of Roberson-Charles' cigarettes by rubbing them on his anal cleft, were both depicted in Episode 4. The summoning of the police was depicted in Episode 6.

Cast
This was the fourth season of The Real World to feature a roster of eight roommates living together. The next season returned to an initial roster of seven roommates.
{| class="wikitable sortable" style="text-align:center;"
! scope="col"| Cast Member
! scope="col"| Age
! scope="col"| Hometown
|-
! scope="row"| 
| 23
| Boston, Massachusetts
|- class="expand-child"
| colspan="3" align="left"| Ashlee grew up in the small New Jersey suburb of Collingswood, where she was the top athlete of her high school. She was captain of her Division 1 basketball team at Northeastern University, though she described her position as that of a "babysitter". She demonstrates and sells power tools, while majoring in communications in school, in the hope of becoming a sideline sports reporter. She and Preston pursue work with local radio station WWOZ while in New Orleans.
|-
! scope="row"| 
| 24
| Arlington, Virginia
|- class="expand-child"
| colspan="3" align="left"| Eric works for the U.S. State Department, for which he travels the globe to brief foreign service personnel on American policy, though his true passion is standup comedy, in which he performs regularly, and has won several competitions. MTV describes him as a "handsome ladies' man" with "dreamy eyes" who dates various girls simultaneously. He has a brother named Brian. He exhibits an attraction to his roommate, Sahar, and becomes friends with her, encouraging her after she sees him perform comedy on stage in New Orleans.
|-
! scope="row"| 
| 21
| Starkville, Mississippi
|- class="expand-child"
| colspan="3" align="left"| Jemmye is a Mississippi State University student and former valedictorian of her high school. Despite growing up from a conservative Southern Baptist community, Jemmye is a supporter of gay marriage and the legalization of marijuana. She enjoys drinking and casual sex, and prefers black men, as her roommate, Knight, is the first white man she sleeps with, in Episode 3. She is close to her mother, Alice, in whom she confides all the intimate details of her life (One of Jemmye's six tattoos honors her mother's victory over breast cancer), though she has not told her about the abusive relationship that she ended just prior to her recent relationship with Mississippi State basketball player Kodi Augustus. She and Knight enter a casual sexual relationship, but it experiences complications due to Jemmye's ambiguity over Kodi, deepening feelings between her and Knight, and Knight's hurtful comments to her, which lead her to seek help at a battered women's shelter in Episode 7. Though Knight is more sympathetic to her problem in Episode 8, when she decides to begin seeing a social worker, and reveals the past abuse to her mother, the tempestuous nature of their relationship recurs subsequently.
|-
! scope="row"| 
| 21
| Jupiter, Florida
|- class="expand-child"
| colspan="3" align="left"| McKenzie is a psychology major and sorority girl from the University of Central Florida, who grew up in a beach community. She is described as a devout but open-minded Catholic from family that includes her parents and three siblings, though according to MTV, she enjoys the bar scene "a little too hard", and knows how to "use her sexuality to get what she wants", sometimes finding herself in compromising situations, though she believes that sex should be based on love, in contrast to others like Knight. MTV also describes as her as a "natural born leader". Her castmates become concerned over her drinking, which she says leads to blackouts. Preston in particular observes her to exhibit an alter ego named "Mary" when she becomes drunk. She eventually meets a man named Grant in Episode 8, with whom she pursues a relationship by the time of the season finale.
|-
! scope="row"| 
| 22
| Boston, Massachusetts
|- class="expand-child"
| colspan="3" align="left"| Preston is a gay black man originally from Bay City, Michigan, currently living in Boston. Preston's first childhood memory involves the crack cocaine addiction of his mother, who later abandoned him at age 17. During the season, he discusses how he came out in high school, and how he was subject to ostracization. He does not have a relationship with his father, who has been in prison, and suffered from medical and financial problems. The conversation Preston had with his father a month prior to moving to New Orleans was the first time he spoke to him in a decade. MTV notes Preston for his provocative, "bitchy" side, and his "outlandish antics." Preston claims to have an "amazing" fashion sense, and expresses his opinions without any "filter". He says he does not become close to many people, though those he does with become his family. He has run a store and worked at a car dealership, but dreams of being a television personality, and pursues radio work with Ashlee at WWOZ. Though he initially eschews monogamy, he and a man named Marty begin seeing each other exclusively by Episode 10.
|-
! scope="row"| | 23
| Kenosha, Wisconsin
|- class="expand-child"
| colspan="3" align="left"| Ryan, who preferred to be called by his last name, Knight, played hockey for the Kenosha Knights and the Fond du Lac Bears, but severe injury to both of his shoulders left him unable to play hockey, and cost him his academic/athletic scholarship at Arizona State University. This also led to an addiction to painkillers, from which he had been recovering for six months. He taught hockey to children, and was pursuing a degree in marketing at the University of Wisconsin–Milwaukee. MTV described him as "promiscuous", though "romantic". He moved to New Orleans to escape negative influences from back home. He was attracted to his roommate, Jemmye, with whom he sleeps in Episode 3, and referred to McKenzie's more conservative views on sex as "goofy".
|-
! scope="row"| 
| 21Biography page for Ryan Leslie at MTV.com
| Tempe, Arizona
|- class="expand-child"
| colspan="3" align="left"| Ryan is a fourth-generation hairstylist who works in a salon with his father, chafes against the assumption that he is gay, and aspires to cut hair for celebrities. Living with both ADHD and OCD, and noting his tendency to chase his roommates around the house naked, MTV describes him as "one of the most bizarre roommates in New Orleans" and the "life of the party." MTV also describes him as being "in touch with his emotions and feminine side", "charismatic" and "creative." In the past he has dealt with both depression and a tumultuous relationship with his father. He indicates an attraction to McKenzie in the premiere, but socializes with her visiting friend in Episode 2, much to McKenzie's ire. After recurring conflicts between Ryan and Preston in Episodes 1 and 4, and because of McKenzie and Preston's view that Ryan does not do chores or clean up after himself, McKenzie describes him as "overall a bad roommate", "messy, inconsiderate, and rude." The cast's concern over Ryan's behavior escalates, and culminates in his eviction from the house in Episode 10. He is the first cast member to be evicted unanimously by the other roommates since Puck in Season 3. He returns, however, for the cast photo shoot in Episode 12.
|-
! scope="row"| 
| 21
| Dearborn Heights, Michigan
|- class="expand-child"
| colspan="3" align="left"| Sahar is a Lebanese-American singer/songwriter and actress. She grew up in a conservative Middle Eastern community, though MTV describes her as a "strong-willed, liberal Muslim". Nonetheless, she is discreet in her home community about not being a virgin. She and her boyfriend of one month, Pablo (whose real name is Elie), put their relationship on hold during her stay in New Orleans, and MTV has indicated she is attracted to her roommate, Eric. Her cast mates nickname her "Hollywood" because of her singing voice. While in New Orleans, she pursues her musical interests by seeking advice from local musician Theresa Andersson, and by putting on performances, in part with encouragement from Eric, though she struggles with lack of confidence and conflicts with Pablo.
|}

 Age at time of filming

 Duration of cast NotesRyan is kicked out of the house in Episode 10 after all of the cast members voted him out of the house.
Ryan made in appearance in the season finale for a photoshoot.

Episodes

After filming
The Real World: New Orleans Reunion premiered on September 22, 2010, and was watched by 1.69 million viewers. It was hosted by Maria Menounos, and featured the entire cast, as they discussed their time during filming and their lives since the show ended.

Since filming, Ashlee and Preston returned to Boston, where they continue to be friends, though Preston ended his relationship with Marty. McKenzie returned to Jupiter, Florida, to finish her final year at college studying social psychology, while remaining in a long distance relationship with Grant. Ryan returned to his father's salon in Arizona, and stated that despite having wanted to move out of Arizona, his time in New Orleans led to a change of heart. Eric became a full-time stand-up comic, and stated that he no longer works for the State Department. Sahar returned to Dearborn, Michigan, where she continues to work on music, and remains in a relationship with Pablo. Jemmye and Knight returned to New Orleans, where they were in the process of moving in together, as Knight did promotional work for his friends' clothing boutique.

Ryan's differences with his roommates were a central focus in discussing the cast's time during filming, including accusations of homophobia on his part, the bitter animosity between him and Preston, and the incident involving Ashlee's missing Percocet. Ryan indicated that he attended the Reunion because he was forced to, and was defiant in the face of questions by Menounos and the cast. Other issues discussed were Ryan's vacillation between kindness and abusiveness, Sahar's dismissal of the notion that she cheated on Pablo with Eric, McKenzie's behavior when drunk, Jemmye's past struggles with domestic violence and her relationship with Knight, and Ashlee's love of gossip and involvement in other people's personal affairs.

In 2017, Preston spoke about being homeless for two years after his stint on MTV.

Ashlee went onto a career as a radio personality in Boston. She works with Santi Deoleo on the Ramiro and the JAM'N 94.5 Morning Show on Jam'n 94.5. In 2020, Ashlee appeared on season 19 of Say Yes to the Dress before marrying Michael Joyce on March 13, 2021.

After competing on multiple seasons of The Challenge and appearing on the fourth season of Ex on the Beach, in 2020, Jemmye announced her departure from reality television.

On November 27, 2014, four years after the season aired, Ryan Knight was found dead at the age of 28, following a house party in Kenosha, Wisconsin. Several of Knight's friends indicated that he had been out partying Wednesday night (November 26) with a bunch of people and ended up at a friend's house. One friend discovered his dead body on Thanksgiving morning (Thursday, November 27), stating he had choked on his own vomit. Several people who were in contact with Knight while he was partying mentioned he had taken 'some pills,' but they were not specific, while saying Knight was upbeat Wednesday night. Knight stated he was dating someone new who made him extremely happy. No official cause of death was determined until March 2015, when autopsy results determined that Knight died of acute mixed drug and alcohol intoxication. Prior to his death, Knight participated in three seasons of The Challenge. His final challenge appearance, Battle of the Exes II, which aired in early 2015, was dedicated in his memory.

The Challenge

Challenges in bold''' indicate the cast member was a finalist on the Challenge.

References

External links
The Real World: New Orleans at MTV.com
Cast biography page at MTV.com

Television shows set in New Orleans
New Orleans (2010)
2010 American television seasons
Television shows filmed in New Orleans